All Reflections Drained is the seventh studio album by American black metal act Xasthur. It is available in an A5 Digipack with a Bonus Disc of songs "Experimenting in between the chapters" and as a limited edition cassette that includes pins and a patch (limited to 500 copies).

Track listing

Bonus Disc 

 Note: Outro is not listed on the CD case.

Personnel 
 Malefic – all instruments, vocals
 M.H. – vocals, keyboards

References

External links 
 All Reflections Drained at Discogs

2009 albums
Xasthur albums
Hydra Head Records albums